Beryozovsky is a rural locality (a settlement) and the administrative center of Beryozovsky Selsoviet of Volchikhinsky District, Altai Krai, Russia. The population was 519 as of 2016. It was founded in 1954. There are 12 streets.

Geography 
Beryozovsky is located 28 km northwest of Volchikha (the district's administrative centre) by road. Novokormikha is the nearest rural locality.

References 

Rural localities in Volchikhinsky District